Annette Jimerson (born 1966) is an American artist who works in a wide variety of media. However, she is known for her whimsical and prolific painting abilities, both realist and abstract. Primarily painting in acrylic and oils, she also makes watercolor works, with subjects ranging from still life, landscapes and portraits to abstracts. She also works in pen and ink, colored pencils and sculptures. Her work has been described as "incredibly lifelike, reviving and breathtaking" (Weems Art Gallery).

Jimerson also writes and creates illustrations for children's books, an occupation that started as a "hobby" and grew from there.

Biography

Jimerson discovered her artistic abilities at the age of seven, and has been developing her artistic skills ever since, branching off into a variety of media. "It was her early age fascination with drawing eyes with detailed eyebrows, eyelids and colors that brought attention to the skillful young artist." When her work was seen at the Memphis University Fine Arts Department, the chairman said that they had "never seen anyone so young paint with such experience."

For the next several years Jimerson was accepted into several galleries across the United States, and featured in many art shows selling many paintings, gaining newspaper and news station coverage with several different press releases, including Channel 7 News, The Perspective and the Cedar Rapids Gazette. Damon Hitchcock, the art professor at San Diego City College, who had 24 years' experience teaching, once gathered the whole drawing class of 33 to watch Jimerson work, stating she was "the most prolific artist he had seen."

Education
1987-1988 San Diego City/Mesa - College, San Diego, California
1986 Milwaukee Institute of Art & Design, Milwaukee, Wisconsin.
1975 University of Memphis, Memphis, Tennessee
1975 Artist Summer Camp, Memphis, Tennessee

Exhibitions
2012 Blick, 75 Artist of all Times (magazine), feature.
2012 Art Price, Art Showcase, Paris, France 
2007 Weem's Art Gallery, Albuquerque, New Mexico, USA
2007, ABQ Art Review, Albuquerque, New Mexico, USA
2006 The Perspective (newspaper spread) "Annette Jimerson: A Picture of an Artist" (issue 7, volume 5, pg 22-33), Albuquerque, New Mexico, USA
1993 Contemperena Art Gallery, Jacksonville, Florida, USA
1993 Channel 7 News Station (news coverage), "Annette Jimerson", Jacksonville, Florida, USA
1993 Berisford Art Gallery, Jacksonville, Florida, USA
1993 The Wildlife Gallery, Orlando, Florida, USA
1992 Peppertree Art Gallery, Cedar Rapids, Iowa, USA
1992 Cedar Rapids Gazette, newspaper spread "Artist looks to Iowa for a better life " (volume 110, NO 188, pg 60), Cedar Rapids, Iowa, USA
1992 Wildlife Art Gallery, Westdale exhibit Cedar Rapids, Iowa, USA
1991 Art Show: Annette Jimerson, San Diego, California, USA

Books and films
Annette Jimerson Art Works (Create Space, 2013) 
Mr. Cuphead (Create Space, 2012)
The Pretty Red Flower with a Single Thorn (Create Space, 2012)
Resurrection: The J.R. Richard Story (film) (Bellinger-Bethea X Films, 2005)

References

External links
Annette Jimerson official website
Artprice.com

 ArtWanted.com

1966 births
Living people
20th-century American women artists
American women painters
Artists from Chicago
University of Memphis alumni
21st-century American women artists
African-American painters
20th-century African-American women
20th-century African-American people
20th-century African-American artists
21st-century African-American women
21st-century African-American artists